Marguerite Diane Webber  Marguerite Empey (July 27, 1932 – August 19, 2008) was an American model, dancer and actress.

Early life
Born in Hollywood, Los Angeles, California, U.S., the daughter of Marguerite (née Andrus), a Hollywood actress and former Miss Long Beach beauty contest winner, and Arthur Guy Empey. She received her formal education at Hollywood High School. As a child, she received ballet lessons from Russian ballerina Maria Bekefi.

Modeling career
In the early 1950s, while developing her professional modeling career, she found employment as a chorus girl at Bimbo's 365 Club in San Francisco. As the decade progressed, she modeled for many professional photographers, including Peter Gowland, Bunny Yeager and Keith Bernard, appearing in a myriad of men's magazines, such as Esquire, and commercial advertising imagery.

Playmate of the Month
Under the name Marguerite Empey, she was Playboy magazine's Playmate of the Month in both May 1955 and February 1956. The photo shoot for the 1956 publication was shot by Russ Meyer. When she posed for the Playboy the second time, Hugh Hefner didn't even recognize her as a Playmate from the previous year.

Album covers and film
Webber appeared on the cover art of several pop music vinyl record albums in the late 1950s-1960s, including George Shearing's Satin Brass (1959), Les Baxter's La Femme (1956) and Jewels of the Sea (1961), Nelson Riddle's Sea of Dreams (1958), Marty Paich's Jazz for Relaxation (1956), Xavier Cugat's Chilie con Cugie (1959),  Otto Cesana's Sheer Ecstasy (1960) and the R.C.A. Japanese release of Seiji Hiraoka & His Quartet's Bedtime Music (1965).

In the 1960s and 1970s, she appeared in the movie Mermaids of Tiburon (1962), and an episode of the television series Voyage to the Bottom of the Sea entitled "The Mermaid" (1967). She also appeared in the film The Trial of Billy Jack (1974).

Nudism
In the mid to late 1960s, as a part of the counter-culture movement in the United States, Webber became involved with nudism and appeared in numerous nudist publications advocating the lifestyle, such as Naked and Together: The Wonderful Webbers by June Lange (1967). In 1965, she traveled to Sioux City to give evidence at the request of a District Attorney's Office in a court trial involving the sending of allegedly obscene nudist publications into the State of Iowa. However, when taking the witness stand, instead of proving the prosecution's case, she gave a spirited defense of the principles of the lifestyle.

Middle-Eastern dance
From 1969 to 1980, Webber's professional career was as a bellydancing instructor at the now defunct Everywoman's Village in Van Nuys, California. She occasionally performed this dance accompanied by some of her better students to the accompaniment of Middle-Eastern music in public places in and around Los Angeles. She founded Perfumes of Araby, one of the first Middle-Eastern dance companies in the United States. Webber's dancing shows were sensual but didn't pander to a male audience, with women and children often attending the performances. 
 For several years, she led and coordinated these outdoor shows, with up to forty performers taking part.

Cultural references
Her iconic status among Playboy models is referenced in Gay Talese's non-fiction book Thy Neighbor's Wife (1980). Talese had published an extensive article in the August 1975 issue of Esquire, in which Webber is considered an object of fantasy as well as an actual person. Two nude photos of her appear in the article, and one is on the cover.

Personal life
In her final years, Webber was a librarian and archivist for a law firm in Santa Monica.

She married Joseph Webber in 1955 (the marriage ended with a divorce in 1986), from which came a son named John (born 1956).

Webber died on August 19, 2008, in Los Angeles, following complications from surgery for cancer. She was 76.

Filmography
 This Is My Body (1960, Short) – Herself
 Mermaids of Tiburon (1962) – Mermaid Queen
 The Swinger (1966) – Model No. 12 (uncredited)
 The Witchmaker (1969) – The Nautch of Tangier
 Sinthia, the Devil's Doll (1970) – The Housewife
 The Blue Hour (1971) – Belly Dancer
 The Trial of Billy Jack (1974) – Belly-Dance Instructor (final film role)

Notable TV guest appearances
 Bold Venture – playing Latin dancer, along with Kathy Kelly and Lisa Gaye, episode 1003, August 1959.
 Peter Gunn – playing Midge in episode "Scuba" (episode 1.21), February 16, 1959.
 Highway Patrol – playing Woman in episode "Coptor Cave-In" (episode 18), February 1959.
 Markham – playing Valerie in episode "The Glass Diamond" (episode 1.8), June 1959.
 Alfred Hitchcock Presents – playing The Other Woman in episode "The Pearl Necklace" (episode 6.29), May 2, 1961.
 Voyage to the Bottom of the Sea – playing Mermaid in episode "The Mermaid" (episode 3.19), January 29, 1967.
 The Stanley Siegel Show – as herself, discussing bellydancing, 1981.

See also
 List of people in Playboy 1953–1959

References

External links
 
 
 Marguerite Empey at Find a Grave

1932 births
2008 deaths
American actresses
American female dancers
Dancers from California
1950s Playboy Playmates
Deaths from cancer in California
Deaths from colorectal cancer
20th-century American women
20th-century American people
21st-century American women